The Maxus V70 is a mid-sized, front wheel drive van produced by Maxus from 2023. It is positioned above the larger Maxus V80.

Overview 
The Maxus V70 was planned to be unveiled online November 2022 by Maxus. Positioned mainly as a light passenger vehicle, the Maxus V70 is offered as 5/6/9-seater variants and rides on Maxus's brand new platform.

Fuel consumption is reported to be 7.4 L/100 km.

Iveco Fidato
The Iveco Fidato is the rebadged variant sold by SAIC-Iveco. The Iveco variant features a restyled front bumper while sharing the exact same dimensions, powertrain, and performance data as the Maxus variant.

References

External links

SAIC Maxus website

Vans
Front-wheel-drive vehicles
Minivans
Minibuses
Cars introduced in 2022